Starotatyshevo (İśke Tatış) is a rural locality (a selo) in Yabalakovsky Selsoviet, Ilishevsky District, Bashkortostan, Russia. The population was 451 as of 2010. There are 5 streets.

Geography 
Starotatyshevo is located 44 km north of Verkhneyarkeyevo (the district's administrative centre) by road. Chuganak is the nearest rural locality.

References 

Rural localities in Ilishevsky District